There are several projections used in maps carrying the name of Johann Heinrich Lambert:

Lambert cylindrical equal-area projection (preserves areas)
Lambert azimuthal equal-area projection (preserves areas)
Lambert conformal conic projection (preserves angles, commonly used in aviation navigation maps)
Lambert equal-area conic projection (preserves areas)